The Treaty of Bardo or Treaty of Qsar es-S'id, Treaty of Ksar Said established a French protectorate over Tunisia that lasted until World War II. It was signed on 12 May 1881 between representatives of the French Republic and the Tunisian bey  Muhammed as-Sadiq, placing Tunisia under the control of the French Resident-General.

The treaty allowed France to control certain geographical areas under the guise of re-establishing order and protecting the Bey from internal opposition and also gave France responsibility for foreign-policy decisions of Tunisia. Later, the Conventions of La Marsa of 8 June 1883 gave France a right to intervene in Tunisia's domestic affairs. Thus subject to the Resident-General’s absolute power, the country lost almost all autonomy not only in external but in practice also in internal affairs.

Name
The name of the treaty originated with the site of the residence of the Tunis court, Le Bardo, where the  Husainid beys had established themselves in the early-18th century.

Background
A raid on Algeria by the Tunisian Khroumir tribe had served as a pretext for French armed forces to invade Tunisia in April 1881. Jules Ferry, the French foreign minister, managed to send a French expeditionary force of approximately 36,000 troops to defeat the Khroumer tribe. The French met little resistance from either the Kroumer tribe or from as-Sadiq. Eventually, the French withdrew their forces after signing the treaty. The military occupation was stated to be temporary.

References

Sources
Encyclopedia of World History (2001)

Further reading
 Ling, Dwight L. "Paul Cambon, Coordinator of Tunisia." The Historian 19.4 (1957): 436–455.

External links

World History 1880 – 1890 AD
The Treaty of Bardo

1880s in Tunisia
1881 in Africa
1881 in France
1881 treaties
Bardo
Treaties of Tunisia
France–Tunisia relations
May 1881 events